Lake Capichigamau is a freshwater body of the southern part of the Eeyou Istchee James Bay (municipality), in the region of Nord-du-Québec, in the province of Quebec, Canada. This lake is part of the Assinica Wildlife Sanctuary. This lake is part of the canton of Bellerive.

Forestry is the main economic activity of the sector. Recreational tourism activities come second.

The hydrographic slope of lake Capichigamau is accessible by a forest road (North-South direction) passing to the west of La Trève Lake and joining towards the South route 113 (linking Lebel-sur-Quévillon to Chibougamau).

The surface of Capichigamau Lake is usually frozen from early November to mid-May, however, safe ice circulation is generally from mid-November to mid-April.

Geography

Toponymy
Of Cree origin, the term "Capichigamau" means "long lake". This name appears for the first time in 1951 on a map of the province of Quebec.

The toponym "Lac Capichigamau" was formalized on December 5, 1968, by the Commission de toponymie du Québec when it was created.

Notes and references

See also 

Eeyou Istchee James Bay
Lakes of Nord-du-Québec
Nottaway River drainage basin